Athlone is a locality in Victoria, Australia. It is located on Drouin - Korumburra Road, in the Shire of Baw Baw.

The Post Office opened in 1902 as Lindermann's, was renamed Athlone in 1912 and closed in 1963.

Sister cities
  Athlone, Ireland

References

Towns in Victoria (Australia)
Shire of Baw Baw